Solomon Tat (born July 29, 1986) is a Nigerian basketball player. He competed for Nigeria at the 2011 FIBA Africa Championship, where the team finished in third place. He is a native of Jos Plateau, Nigeria and played college basketball with the Virginia Cavaliers men's basketball team. He was a tri-captain of the 2009-10 Cavaliers team as a senior.

References

1986 births
Living people
Nigerian men's basketball players
Nigerian emigrants to the United States
Virginia Cavaliers men's basketball players
African Games gold medalists for Nigeria
African Games medalists in basketball
Competitors at the 2011 All-Africa Games